Uzo Egonu  (25 December 1931 – 14 August 1996) was a Nigerian-born artist who settled in Britain in the 1940s, only once returning to his homeland for two days in the 1970s, although he remained concerned with African political struggles. According to Rasheed Araeen, Egonu was "perhaps the first person from Africa, Asia or the Caribbean to come to Britain after the War with the sole intention of becoming an artist." According to critic Molara Wood, "Egonu's work merged European and Igbo traditions but more significantly, placed Africa as the touchstone of modernism. In combining the visual languages of Western and African art, he helped redefine the boundaries of modernism, thereby challenging the European myth of the naïve, primitive African artist."

Biography
Born in Onitsha, Nigeria, Egonu was in his early teens when in 1945 he first travelled to England. Having already begun to draw while attending Sacred Heart College, Calabar, before leaving for the UK, he eventually studied Fine Arts and Typography at Camberwell School of Arts and Crafts, London, from 1949 to 1952, and went on to participate in a number of exhibitions.

In 1977, he was among the Black artists and photographers whose work represented the UK at the Second World Festival of Black Arts and African Culture (Festac '77) in Lagos, Nigeria (the others being Winston Branch, Ronald Moody, Mercian Carrena, Armet Francis, Emmanuel Taiwo Jegede, Neil Kenlock, Donald Locke, Cyprian Mandala, Ossie Murray, Sue Smock, Lance Watson and Aubrey Williams).  In 1983 the International Association of Art called on Egonu to advise it for the rest of his life, an honour that he shared with painters and sculptors such as Henry Moore, Joan Miró and Louise Nevelson. Egonu was also included in two major 20th-century exhibitions featuring Black British artists: in 1989 the landmark show at London's Hayward Gallery, The Other Story, and seven years later Transforming the Crown, curated by the Caribbean Cultural Center in New York City. He was a member of the Rainbow Art Group, an initiative set up in 1978, which recognized the main problem that exists in relation to the work and aspirations of all ethnic minorities in the art world, including their own.

In later years he suffered two heart attacks and deteriorating eyesight, and on 14 August 1996 he died in London.

Style and legacy
The subject of a study by Olu Oguibe entitled Uzo Egonu: An African Artist in the West (1995), Egonu has also often been described as "perhaps Africa's greatest modern painter". Eddie Chambers has commented on Egonu's "remarkable ability to render landscapes and cityscapes as compelling and fascinating geometrical configurations, each very different in its representational aspects." His work featured in the 2015–16 exhibition No Colour Bar: Black British Art in Action 1960–1990 at the Guildhall Art Gallery, City of London.

Selected exhibitions
 Solo
 2004: Uzo Egonu's London, Museum of London, London 
 1997: Uzo Egonu: Past and Present in the Diaspora, InIVA
1986: Uzo Egonu Now 1986: Stateless People, Royal Festival Hall, London
 Group
 2015: No Colour Bar: Black British Art in Action 1960–1990, Guildhall Art Gallery, London
 2001: The Short Century, Villa Stuck, Munich, Germany; House of World Cultures, Berlin, Germany
 1997: Transforming the Crown: African, Asian and Caribbean Artists in Britain 1966–1996, New York City
 1990: Herbert Art Gallery and Museum, Coventry
 1989: The Other Story: Afro-Asian Artists in Post-War Britain, Hayward Gallery, London
 1986: Third World Within, Brixton Art Gallery, London (31 March–22 April)
 1975: Ljubljana Graphic Art Biennial, Graphic Art Biennial, Ljubljana, Slovenia
 1973: Commonwealth Institute Art Gallery, London

References

Further reading
 Eddie Chambers, "Uzo Egonu and Contemporary African Art in Britain, in Black Artists in British Art: A History Since the 1950s, I.B. Tauris, 2014, pp. 56–73. .
 Olu Oguibe, Uzo Egonu: An African Artist in the West, Third Text Publications, 1995. .

External links
 Layla Gatens, "Artistic Insight: Uzo Egonu", NoColourBar blog, 5 November 2015.
 Uzo Egonu works at The Tate.

1931 births
1996 deaths
Alumni of Camberwell College of Arts
Artists from Onitsha
Black British artists
Nigerian artists